Seattle Naval Hospital was a military hospital created during World War II in the city of Shoreline, Washington, for convalescing naval sailors in the Pacific Theater of the War. In 1945, there were over 2000 patients and 600 staff members at the hospital. After the war, the facility was converted into a tuberculosis sanitarium (Firland) until 1973. Since then the location has been used by the Washington State Department of Social and Health Services to house developmentally disabled adults.

During the World War II, the only major development in Shoreline was the Naval Hospital. The city of Seattle was chosen as the site for the construction of the naval hospital due to the lack of hospital beds. Between March and August 1942, the construction of the Seattle Naval Hospital was under way. On July 20, 1943, it was expanded with 500 beds. In 1945, the hospital employed 15 doctors and surgeons who served as naval doctors.

Joel Thompson Boone, a United States Navy officer, was the hospital's commandant. Eleanor Roosevelt, the first lady of the United States, visited the hospital several times to encourage the wounded.

In 1947, the hospital was transferred to King County and after a few years the original buildings were destroyed.

See also 
List of United States Navy installations

References

External links 
 Fircrest on Washington State Department of Social and Health Services official page

1942 establishments in Washington (state)
Defunct hospitals in Washington (state)